WMMX (107.7 FM) is a radio station broadcasting a hot adult contemporary format. Licensed to Dayton, Ohio, US, it serves the Dayton area.  The station is owned by iHeartMedia, Inc. and licensed as iHM Licenses, LLC. Its studios are located just outside downtown Dayton and its transmitter is in south Dayton off Interstate 75.

History

In early 1985, urban WDAO moved to AM, and 107.7 switched to an adult contemporary format as Star 107.7/WWSN under owner Stoner Broadcasting.  This format would last until 1991, when the station switched to hot adult contemporary under Vice President/General Manager Deborah Parenti (who oversaw the switchover of the call letters from WWSN to WMMX) and Randy James as Mix 107.7/WMMX.  In 1993, Bob Sweeney became the new morning show host, replacing "The Tall Guys".  He would serve as morning host along with co-host Kristi Leigh until 2005, when he moved to smooth jazz 106.5 WDSJ as morning show host, and would be replaced by PD Jeff Stevens.  The station would be sold by Stoner Broadcasting to American Radio Systems in 1995, and in turn Jacor would purchase the station in 1998, and later be merged with Clear Channel Communications eventually taking over the station.  In the late 1990s, the station would take a 1980s-lean, as the 1980s oldies format became popular during this period, and the station would air a 1980s Oldies format during the weekends called "The Time Warp Weekend". Upon his move from sister Alternative WXEG 103.9 The X in the Summer of 1998, new PD Jeff Stevens would not only replace midday host Kate Burdett, who moved on to other stations in the Dayton cluster, but also add a specialty show to the line-up entitled The Time Warp Cafe from Noon-1 PM, spotlighting music from the 1980s and adding in a "Vault" song, which is a song that reached cult status in the 1980s or received a lot of play via music video on MTV but never hit big on the charts. The first song played during this segment was "Don't Pay The Ferryman" by Chris DeBurgh. A few years later, a "Sounds like the 80s" song was added, which was a song from the early 1990s that featured a 1980s artist. The very first title played was "So Close" by Daryl Hall and John Oates from 1990. It was later retitled "A Taste of the 90s" to broaden the selection of titles that could be played. In 2006, the "Time Warp Weekend" was replaced by "The Whatever Weekend", in response to the growing popularity of adult hits stations across the country. In early 2010, weekends were renamed "The Weekend Mix" and remain named that to this day. The 1980s lean also continued, including the rebroadcast of Casey Kasem's American Top 40 countdowns Saturday mornings from 6 to 10, which featured originally aired broadcasts from 1980 to 1988. WMMX has been airing the rebroadcasts of AT40 since 2001 when they were packed as "AT40 Flashback", at which time the shows were condensed three-hour rebroadcasts of AT40, usually beginning the countdowns around #30. This was due to syndicator Premiere Networks believing that songs between #40-#31 would be too unknown for the target audience to remember, which could cause listeners to tune out due to the unfamiliarity with said songs. When Premiere canceled the program, WMMX continued to rerun the package until they were replaced by an all-new rebroadcast package from Premiere, branded as "Casey Kasem's American Top 40: The '80s" in April 2007, which would broadcast the shows in their original, four-hour format.

Former on-air staff
Alan Rantz (middays 2004–06; also music director)
Todd Hollst (overnights 2000–01; also promotions director)
Bob Sweeney (mornings 1993–2005)
Chris Collins (morning show news anchor/co-host 1995–2007; now at WHIO-AM-FM; also does the "Farm Market Report" for NewsCenter 7 at noon; voice of the WSU Raiders)
Brian Michaels (2001–03; 2010 – October 2011, host of NightMix), now at WUBE-FM Cincinnati 
Sandy Collins (now Afternoon news anchor at KSL Newsradio, Salt Lake City)
Dan Edwards (now a news reporter for WDTN TV 2)
Fred Tomlinson (1992-1996; 7:00 to Midnight on air host of "Classic Hits at Night." Host of "Saturday Night at the Oldies" on Star 107-7, and host of "Saturday Night Mix" on Mix 107-7.)
Dean Taylor (1986–2001; traffic 2001–07; now at WHIO-TV as traffic fill-in reporter)
Trent Darbee (overnights 1999–2000)
Brian Bruchey (former mix morning show producer/weekends)
Sean Roberts (weekends; now at WABX in Evansville, Indiana)
Jamey "Flash" Meehan (weekends)
Kate Burdett (middays)
Joe Thomas (promotions director 2000–09, overnights 2000–01, fill-in 2000–09)
Randy James (off-the-air program director, 1991–94)
Jeff Ballentine (off-the-air program director, 1994–98)
Bobbie Enderle (promotions director)
Rick LaBeau (production, host of Saturday Night Mix since 1991, job eliminated in 2012 but rehired full-time July 2014 as production director)
Andrew Scott (weekends)
Eric Lee (weekends)

External links
Mix 107.7 website

MMX
Hot adult contemporary radio stations in the United States
IHeartMedia radio stations
Radio stations established in 1964
Taft Broadcasting